The Most may refer to:
 The Most with Alison Stewart, an American TV news program
 The Most (TV series), an American program on The History Channel
 The Most (Down to Nothing album)
 The Most (The Cruel Sea album)
 The Most (Swedish band)
 "The Most", a song by Irving Berlin
 "The Most", a song by Justin Bieber from his 2015 album Purpose

See also
 
 
 Most (disambiguation)